MSI Wind PC is a nettop counterpart to the MSI Wind Netbook. The MSI Wind PC is sold in Europe, Asia, and in the United States, barebones kits were available until Summer 2009, when desktop units also became available.

On January 15, 2009, MSI announced a new model of the Wind, the NetTop D130, with a dual-core processor.

There are 3 MSI wind PC models listed on the MSI website: Wind PC, Wind PC (Linux), and the Wind PC 100. In addition, there are 8 products using the "Nettop" name and 6 that use alphanumeric codes, i.e. 6676-003BUS or 6667BB-004US.

External links
 MSI Press Release
 MSI Wind Box Series

See also
 Nettop
 Acer Aspire Revolution
 ASUS Eee Box
 Dell Studio Hybrid
 Mac Mini

References

MSI nettops